is a district located in Gifu Prefecture, Japan.

As of July 2011 the district has an estimated population of 18,389. The total area is 5.17 km2.

The district has only one town.
Kitagata

District Timeline
April 1, 1959-
The village of Shinsei gained town status.
The village of Sunan gained town status.
, the district comprises the former districts of Motosu, Mushiroda (席田郡), parts of Katagata (方県郡), and parts of Ōno (大野郡, not to be confused with Ōno District in Hida region)
May 1, 2003-The towns of Sunami and Hozumi merged to form the new city of Mizuho.
February 1, 2004-The towns of Itonuki, Motosu and Shinsei, and the village of Neo merged to become the new city of Motosu.
The town of Kitagata was scheduled to merge with the city of Gifu but the deal was cancelled on August 31, 2004.

Notes

Districts in Gifu Prefecture